The Election Commission of India held indirect 9th presidential elections of India on 16 July 1987. R. Venkataraman with 740,148 votes won over his nearest rival V. R. Krishna Iyer who got 281,550 votes.

Schedule
The election schedule was announced by the Election Commission of India on 10 June 1987.

Results
Source: Web archive of Election Commission of India website

Aftermath
R. Venkatraman was sworn-in as president, on 25 July 1987. Since he was the sitting vice president at the time, the 1987 Indian vice presidential election was also needed, which was won by Shankar Dayal Sharma.

See also
 1984 Indian vice presidential election
 1987 Indian vice presidential election

References

1987 elections in India
Presidential elections in India